General elections were held in Fiji between 19 May and 20 June 1914.

Electoral system
The Legislative Council included seven elected Europeans who were elected from six constituencies created as a result of amendments to the constitution made on 31 January 1914, which increased the number of elected Europeans from six to seven and the number of constituencies from five to six. The new constituencies were Eastern, Northern, Southern, Suva, Vanua Levu & Taveuni and Western.

Results

Appointed members

Aftermath
Further changes were made to the constitution in 1916, increasing the number of nominated members from 10 to 12; eleven were civil servants and the other had to be a British subject not holding public office. Badri Maharaj was chosen as the twelfth nominated member, becoming the first Indo-Fijian member of the Legislative Council.

References

1914 elections in Oceania
1914 in Fiji
1914
1914 elections in the British Empire